Miles Point is an unincorporated community in Carroll County, in the U.S. state of Missouri.

History
Miles Point was laid out in 1855 by Jonathan Miles, and named for him. A post office called Miles Point was established in 1858, and remained in operation until 1903.

References

Unincorporated communities in Carroll County, Missouri
Unincorporated communities in Missouri